The 1972–73 Dallas Chaparrals season was the sixth and final season of the Chaparrals in the American Basketball Association. The Chaps failed to make the playoffs for the first time in franchise history, finishing dead last, though they missed the final playoff spot by just two games. Low attendance that had been a problem for most of their tenure led to an agreement from the owners to a San Antonio group led by Angelo Drossos, John Schaefer and Red McCombs. Part of this "lend-lease" deal involved the group being leased the team to play in San Antonio for three years, and if the team was not purchased by the end of the agreement (1975), it would be returned to Dallas. However, the first season in San Antonio turned out to be a roaring success, and the group decided to buy the team outright and keep the team in San Antonio, which managed to join the NBA when the two leagues merged in 1976. Dallas would not have a pro basketball season until 1980-81, when the Mavericks began play.

Roster 
 -- Art Becker - Power forward 
 25 Coby Dietrick - Center 
 15 Ronald Franz - Small forward 
 15 Shaler Halimon - Small forward 
 11 Joe Hamilton - Point guard 
 42 Collis Jones - Small forward 
 23 Larry Jones - Point guard 
 Nick Jones - Point guard 
 33 Rich Jones - Small forward 
 23 Steve Jones - Shooting guard 
 50 Goo Kennedy - Power forward 
 54 Mike Maloy - Power forward 
 24 Bob Netolicky - Center 
 13 Gene Phillips - Shooting guard 
 13 James Silas - Shooting guard 
 21 Skeeter Swift - Shooting guard 
 40 Ansley Truitt - Power forward 
 23 Bob Warren - Shooting guard

Final standings

Western Division

Awards and honors
1973 ABA All-Star Game selections (game played on February 6, 1973)
 Rich Jones

References

 Chaparrals on Basketball Reference

External links
 RememberTheABA.com 1972-73 regular season and playoff results
 RememberTheABA.com Dallas Chaparrals page

Dallas Chaparrals
Dallas
Dallas Chaparrals, 1972-73
Dallas Chaparrals, 1972-73